Holtet is a light rail/tram stop on the Ekeberg line of the Oslo Tramway. It is located at Holtet in Ekeberg, in the borough of Nordstrand, in Oslo, Norway.

It was opened on 11 June 1917 by A/S Ekebergbanen and has a balloon loop. The station is served by lines 13 and 19. Holtet also has a tram depot nearby.

References

Oslo Tramway stations in Oslo
Railway stations opened in 1917
1917 establishments in Norway